Michael David may refer to:

 Michael David (painter) (born 1954), American painter
 Michael David (producer),  Broadway producer
 Michael David (judge), judge in the Supreme Court of South Australia 2006–2014
 one member of the duo Classixx

See also